In the Americas Region for 2015 Rugby World Cup qualifying, Argentina had automatically qualified for the World Cup, and two places were available in the Americas qualification process, which were taken by Canada and the United States. An additional Americas team, Uruguay, also qualified as the Play-off winner.

Format

The qualification process for the 2–3 teams from the Americas participating in the 2015 Rugby World Cup are as follows:

Round 1:

Round 1 was split into two sections, Round 1A and Round 1B.
 The 2012 NACRA Rugby Championship acted as the qualification matches for Round 1A. The Caribbean teams were split into two zones consisting of two rounds.
 Round 1 consisted of the bottom five teams of the NACRA region, to the IRB rankings, playing each other in a robin-round format. The winning nations of either zone then advanced to Round 2 of their respective zones. The winning nations in either zone after Round 2, earned the right to compete for the NACRA Rugby Championship title, thus being able to advance to the Round 1 Final.
 The 2012 CONSUR B Rugby Championship acted as the qualification matches for Round 1B. The second division teams all played each other once, with the winning team of the tournament advancing to the Round 1 Final.
 The Round 1 Final saw the Caribbean champions and the CONSUR B champions play each other for the right to play in the Round 2 Final against the losing team of the CONSUR A tournament, or Round 2A.

Round 2:
 The 2012 CONSUR A Rugby Championship formed the qualification process for Round 2A. The top two teams of the tournament, remained in the division for the 2013 Championship. The bottom placed team, advanced to Round 2 Final to play the Round 1 Final victors. The winning side of Round 2 Final, earned the right to compete in the 2013 CONSUR A tournament, keeping their Rugby World Cup dreams alive.

Round 3:

Like Round 1, Round 3 was also split into two sections, Round 3A and Round 3B.
 Round 3A used the 2013 CONSUR A Rugby Championship as the qualification matches. The winning side would advance to the Round 3 Final and would play the losing side from Round 3B.
 Round 3B saw Canada and the United States play a two-match series in August 2013. The winner of the series qualified for the 2015 Rugby World Cup as Americas 1, and enters the tournament in Pool D. The losing team parachuted down to the Round 3 Final and would play the winning side from Round 3A.
 The Round 3 Final, would see the loser of Round 3B play a two-match series with the winning team from Round 3A. The winner of this two-match series, qualified for the Rugby World Cup as Americas 2. The losing side, would move to the Repechage and play in an inter-confederation match against the second placed team from the Asian qualification process.

Entrants
The 2015 Rugby World Cup qualifying teams that will compete for the 2015 Rugby World Cup – Americas qualification. (World rankings, shown in brackets, are to first Americas qualification match on 24 March 2012)

 
  (87)
  (78)
  (48)
  (35)
  (13)
  (67)
  (23)
  (75)
  (59)
  (86)
  (71)
  (41)
  (64)
  (76)
  (50)
  (17)
  (21)
  (53)

Qualified nations
  (Automatic qualifier)
  (Americas 1)
  (Play-off winner)
  (Americas 2)

Round 1

Round 1A: 2012 NACRA Rugby Championship
The 2012 NACRA Championship was the first qualifying event for the 2015 Rugby World Cup. The tournament featured nine IRB members from the Caribbean and North and South America. Those teams, along with their IRB World Ranking and rating points as of March 19, 2012, were as follows:

Teams
 48th, 45.94
 50th, 45.85
 59th, 42.54
 67th, 41.23
 71st, 40.00* (new ranking)
 76th, 39.30
 78th, 39.13
 86th, 36.35
 87th, 36.33

Zone 1

Round 1
The winning team, Cayman Islands, advanced to Zone 1 Round 2 to face Bahamas and Bermuda.

Round 2
The winning team, Bermuda, advanced to the final of the 2012 NACRA Championship, or Round 1A final, to face Zone 2 winners Guyana.

Zone 2

Round 1
The winning team, Barbados, advanced to Zone 2 Round 2 to face Guyana and Trinidad and Tobago.

Round 2
The winning team, Guyana, advanced to the final of the 2012 NACRA Caribbean Championship, or Round 1A Final, to face Zone 1 winners Bermuda.

Round 1A Final: NACRA Rugby Championship Final
The winning team, Bermuda, advanced to the Round 1 Final to face the winner of the 2012 CONSUR B, or Round 1B victors, Paraguay.

Round 1B: 2012 CONSUR Rugby Championship B
The winning team, Paraguay, advanced to the Round 1 Final to face Bermuda, the winner of the 2012 NACRA Rugby Championship.

Number in brackets indicates the pre-tournament IRB ranking of team

Round 1 Final
The winner of 2012 NACRA Rugby Championship, Bermuda, played the winner of the 2012 CONSUR B tournament, Paraguay, in order to progress through to Round 2. Paraguay were the home team as they were the higher ranked team at 39 to Bermuda's 49.

Round 2

Round 2A: 2012 CONSUR Rugby Championship A
The top two teams remained in CONSUR A for the 2013 tournament (Round 3A), thus still being able to qualify for the 2015 Rugby World Cup. The bottom placed team, Brazil, had to face a relegation challenge, Round 2 Final, from the CONSUR B champion, Paraguay, to earn to right to compete in the 2013 tournament and stay within the chance of qualifying for Rugby World Cup 2015.

Round 2 Final: CONSUR A/B relegation playoff
Paraguay, the winner of Round 1, faced Brazil, the last placed team in the 2012 Consur A competition, or Round 2A, for the right to compete in the 2013 Consur A, or Round 3A, and remain within the chance of qualifying for the World Cup.

Being the higher ranked team, Brazil hosted the match in front of over 10,000 spectators in São Paulo, Brazil's biggest ever home crowd.

Round 3

Round 3A: 2013 CONSUR Rugby Championship A
Round 3A was contested concurrently with the 2013 South American Rugby Championship "A" in Montevideo, Uruguay and Temuco, Chile between 27 April and 4 May 2013. However, this tournament included already qualified nation Argentina, and therefore had no effect on who advanced to the NACRA-CONSUR playoff final. This means fixtures against Argentina by Brazil, Chile or Uruguay were not included as Rugby World Cup qualification matches. The winner of this qualifying round, Uruguay, advanced to the NACRA-CONSUR playoff final, to stay in contention for qualifying for the 2015 Rugby World Cup as Americas 2 or to progress to the Repechage qualifying.

Round 3B: United States v Canada Home & Away playoffs
Canada defeated the USA in a two-legged play off, sweeping the series and winning 40-20 on aggregate, thus qualifying for the World Cup as Americas 1. USA progressed to the NACRA-CONSUR playoff final against Uruguay.

Round 3 Final: NACRA-CONSUR playoff final
The losing team from Round 3B, United States, played the winner from Round 3A, Uruguay to determine who qualifies as Americas 2. 
The final consisted of a home-and-away series, with the winner on aggregate, United States (59–40 or 1–0), qualifying for the World Cup as Americas 2.

The loser, Uruguay, advanced to the repechage to play Asia 2, Hong Kong.

References

External links
Rugby World Cup Americas qualification

2015
Americas
2012 in South American rugby union
2013 in South American rugby union
2014 in South American rugby union
2012 in North American rugby union
2013 in North American rugby union
2014 in North American rugby union